Wesley Cook Bentley is an American actor. He is best known for his roles as Ricky Fitts in American Beauty (1999), which earned him a nomination for the BAFTA Award for Supporting Actor; Seneca Crane in The Hunger Games (2012); Doyle in Interstellar (2014); Erik in Mission: Impossible – Fallout; and Jamie Dutton in Yellowstone. He was one of four subjects in the documentary My Big Break (2009), which covered his fame after American Beauty and his subsequent struggles with substance abuse. Rebuilding his career, he starred in the premiere of Venus in Fur by David Ives in the off-Broadway production in 2010. His other film roles include The Four Feathers (2002), Ghost Rider (2007), P2 (2007), and Pete's Dragon (2016).

He began appearing in the FX anthology series American Horror Story in 2014, playing Edward Mordrake in Freak Show. In 2015, he starred as Detective John Lowe in Hotel, for which he received a Critics' Choice Television Award nomination. The following year, he played Dylan (the actor who plays Ambrose White in My Roanoke Nightmare) in the series' sixth cycle, subtitled Roanoke. In 2018, Bentley began starring in the Paramount Network original television series Yellowstone.

Early life
Bentley was born in Jonesboro, Arkansas, and raised in Little Rock, the third of four sons of Cherie Baker and David Bentley. His father is a minister, and his mother is a chaplain and ordained elder in the Arkansas Conference, both in the United Methodist denomination. His grandfather was an evangelical minister. He is of German, Scottish, and English descent.

In 1996, he graduated from Sylvan Hills High School in Sherwood, Arkansas. He attended the Juilliard School's Drama Division as part of its Group 29 (1996–2000) but left the school after one year to pursue his acting career.

Career
Bentley has starred in several films, including the Oscar-winning American Beauty, The Four Feathers, P2, and Ghost Rider. He starred in the thriller Dolan's Cadillac, based on the short story by Stephen King, and There Be Dragons by director Roland Joffé. Bentley is one of the main subjects in the documentary My Big Break, directed by Tony Zierra, which follows Bentley and three of his former roommates, Chad Lindberg, Brad Rowe and Greg Fawcett, as they pursue their dream to become successful actors in Hollywood.

In the 2007 film Ghost Rider, Bentley played Blackheart, a demonic being that was the main antagonist.

In 2010, he starred opposite Nina Arianda in the premiere of the David Ives play Venus in Fur at the Classic Stage Company in New York City.

In March 2012, Bentley had a supporting role in the blockbuster movie The Hunger Games, playing gamemaker Seneca Crane.

In 2012, Bentley also starred with Amber Tamblyn and Vincent Piazza in the indie feature 3 Nights in the Desert, directed by Gabriel Cowan.

Bentley and Scott Speedman starred in a pilot episode for a planned HBO series created by Ryan Murphy, Open, but the series was not picked up. The following year, Bentley guest starred in Murphy's FX series American Horror Story for its fourth season, Freak Show. In 2015, he was promoted to the main cast for the fifth season, Hotel, starring as Detective John Lowe. In 2016, he played a main role in the sixth season, Roanoke.

Since 2018, he has played Jamie Dutton on Paramount Network's Yellowstone.

On Jimmy Kimmel Live! on December 9, 2022, Bentley said he turned down the role of Spider-Man, a role later offered to Tobey Maguire.

Personal life
Bentley was married to actress Jennifer Quanz from 2001 to 2009. They divorced in 2009, reportedly  due to his substance abuse. He married producer Jacqui Swedberg in 2010, and their son was born in 2010 and their daughter in 2014.

In a New York Times article on February 8, 2010, he described his descent into drug addiction that began almost immediately after his success in American Beauty. He said he hid his addiction from his wife; they separated in 2006, and he moved to an apartment where he began doing drugs full-time. During this time, he worked sporadically, just enough to pay bills and buy drugs. His addiction began to cause problems on the sets of the films P2 and Weirdsville and in 2008, he was arrested and ordered into counseling and 12-step programs. He relapsed, however, and "continued using heroin until he was broke".

In July 2009, he said, he confessed to a friend, "I’m a drug addict, and an alcoholic, and I need help. I need help or I’m going to die".  He again entered a 12-step program and, while clean since then, considers himself on the path to recovery.

The documentary My Big Break (2009) captures Bentley's early life as an unknown actor, his sudden fame after American Beauty, his subsequent emotional struggle with fame, and his admission years later that he was recovering from an addiction to drugs and alcohol. He began to rebuild his career by starring in the Off-Broadway premiere of the play Venus in Fur by David Ives.

In addition to Bentley's parents being Methodist ecclesiastical leaders, Bentley’s  grandfather was an evangelical minister who was upset with Bentley’s role in Yellowstone because the series included nudity, which he found offensive.

Filmography

Film

Television

Stage

Awards and nominations

References

External links

1978 births
20th-century American male actors
21st-century American male actors
American male film actors
American people of English descent
American people of German descent
American people of Scottish descent
Juilliard School alumni
Living people
Male actors from Arkansas
Outstanding Performance by a Cast in a Motion Picture Screen Actors Guild Award winners
People from Arkansas
People from Craighead County, Arkansas
People from Jonesboro, Arkansas
People from Sherwood, Arkansas
Sylvan Hills High School alumni